The following are the winners of the 29th annual (2002) Origins Award, presented at Origins 2003:

External links
 2002 Origins Awards Winners

2002 awards
2002 awards in the United States
Origins Award winners